The Beattie well tanks were a series of 111 steam locomotives of seven different designs produced for the London and South Western Railway (LSWR) between 1852 and 1875. All carried the water supply in well tanks, set low down between the frames. The first three designs were of the 2-2-2WT wheel arrangement, the last four being 2-4-0WT. Most were designed by Joseph Hamilton Beattie, the LSWR Mechanical Engineer, but the last few locomotives built to the seventh design incorporated modifications made by his son and successor, William George Beattie. Most were intended for the LSWR's suburban services, but were later used elsewhere on the LSWR system before withdrawal. Apart from three locomotives which lasted until 1962, withdrawal occurred between 1871 and 1899.

Background
The LSWR developed an extensive network of suburban lines in south-west London between the 1840s and the 1880s. Initially, these services were operated using tender locomotives. mainly 2-2-2s, designed by John Viret Gooch, the LSWR Locomotive Superintendent. 

In 1850, the LSWR decided that the London suburban passenger services should be operated using small tank locomotives. To determine the most suitable type, Gooch's successor Joseph Hamilton Beattie, the LSWR Mechanical Engineer, prepared a series of designs for six-wheeled well tank locomotives, each of which incorporated one or more differences from the previous class. A small quantity of each was produced: between 1852 and 1859, 26 were built, to six different designs, followed by a seventh design built in much larger numbers.

2-2-2 well tanks

Tartar class
Six locomotives (nos. 2, 12, 13, 17, 18, 33) built by Sharp Brothers (works numbers 689–694) and delivered in May–July 1852. The main frames were positioned inside the wheels, but an additional set of outside frames supported the trailing axle, and the leading axle also had outside bearings attached to springs below the slide bars. The well tanks held  of water, and the bunker held  of coke.

When new, they were used on the London suburban services, but by mid-1860 had moved west – three were used in the Exeter area, two on the Seaton branch line, and one on the Chard branch line. Later on, some were used on the Lymington branch line, but by the end of 1867 all were on the Exmouth branch. No. 18 was withdrawn in 1871, and the others followed at intervals unlil the last one, no. 17, was withdrawn in 1874.

Sussex class
Eight locomotives (nos. 1, 4, 6, 14, 15, 19, 20, 36) built by the LSWR at Nine Elms in May–December 1852. They differed from the Tartar class in several ways, primarily in using smaller driving wheels of  diameter.

As with the Tartar class, they were originally used in the London area, but later moved elsewhere – three were operating in the Southampton area by 1864, and others were used in the Exmouth, Poole and Yeovil areas. Between 1870 and 1872 they were transferred to the duplicate list, the numbers being prefixed with a zero in the records – for example, no. 1 became no. 01 in July 1870. This was done in order to release their old numbers for new locomotives, including no. 36 of the 298 class. Withdrawal occurred between 1871 and 1877.

Chaplin class
Three locomotives (nos. 9, 10, 34) built at Nine Elms in July–August 1856, they differed from the Sussex class in having  trailing wheels, water capacity  and coke capacity .

After use in the London area, they moved to Bishopstoke or Salisbury, and were later used at Stokes Bay, Dorchester and Bournemouth. They were transferred to the duplicate list in 1870–74 (no. 9 becoming no. 09, etc.) and were withdrawn in 1876–77.

Earlier 2-4-0 well tanks

Minerva class
Three locomotives (nos. 11, 16, 39) built at Nine Elms in May–July 1856. Generally larger than the preceding designs, they were of the 2-4-0WT wheel arrangement, having coupled wheels of  diameter, leading wheels of  diameter, and cylinders measuring  mounted outside the frames. The well tanks held  of water, and the bunker held  of coke.

Originally used around London, two moved to Woking by 1866 and the other one to Guildford. Later they were used at Salisbury, and one was eventually at Bournemouth. They were transferred to the duplicate list in 1872–74 (no. 11 becoming no. 011, etc.), and were withdrawn in 1874–83.

Nelson class
Three locomotives (nos. 143–145) built at Nine Elms in July–August 1858. The leading axle had no outside bearings.

The names were all of former admirals in the Royal Navy: 143 Nelson, 144 Howe and 145 Hood. These were intended for the Lymington branch, but only one was sent there initially – the other two went to London. All three had moved to Exeter by 1867, later on, they were used in other areas such as Ash, Weymouth and Yeovil. Transfer to the duplicate list occurred in 1880–81 (the three becoming nos. 0143–0145), followed by withdrawal in 1882–85.

Nile class
Three locomotives (nos. 154–156) built at Nine Elms in April–May 1859. Based on the Minerva class, several changes were made to the dimensions. The well tanks held  of water.

The names were all of historic battles: 154 Nile, 155 Cressy and 156 Hogue. After use in London, they moved to other places like Dorchester, Exeter, Gosport, Guildford or Weymouth. They were withdrawn in 1882.

Standard 2-4-0 well tanks: 298 class

Having chosen the most suitable characteristics, Beattie prepared a standard design of 2-4-0WT with  driving wheels and cylinders , bore by stroke; and the LSWR began to take delivery of these in 1863. The new design eventually totalled 85 locomotives; most came from the Manchester firm of Beyer, Peacock and Company between 1863 and 1875, but three were built in the LSWR workshops at Nine Elms during 1872. Their numbers were 33, 34, 36, 44, 76, 177–220, 243–270, 298, 299, 314 and 325–329.

Locomotive names
All of the earlier locomotives were named, together with five of the 298 class. The names were as follows:

Locomotives numbered between 1 and 76 were built as replacements for older locomotives, and used both the number and name of the locomotive being replaced.

Notes

References

London and South Western Railway locomotives
Well tank locomotives
Standard gauge steam locomotives of Great Britain
Passenger locomotives